The Second XI Championship is a season-long cricket competition in England that is competed for by the reserve teams of those county cricket clubs that have first-class status.  The competition started in 1959 and has been contested annually ever since.

All the then 17 first-class counties contested the first two competitions in 1959 and 1960; the next season when all 17 entered was 1977, though the number of teams in any one year was never lower than 14 (in 1971). Gloucestershire and Somerset entered a combined team for two seasons, 1967 and 1968.

Before 1959, many second XIs of the first-class counties contested the Minor Counties Cricket Championship, winning the championship 23 times.  A few continued to do so and the last to withdraw from the Minor Counties was Somerset 2nd XI after the 1987 season, though Somerset had participated in both competitions from 1959 to 1966 and since 1975.

At present, all 18 current first-class counties take part in the Second XI Championship along with the MCC Young Cricketers team.  It was not possible for all teams to play each other and different numbers of matches were played by each team.  As a result, the table had to be based on a percentage of points obtained to points possible. Therefore, for 2009 the competition was split into North and South divisions, with ten teams in each division and each team in a division playing all the others once. The team added to make the number up to twenty was Marylebone Cricket Club Universities. The two divisional winners play each other to determine the overall champion.

In 2001, a Second XI Trophy was introduced.  This is a limited overs competition with the teams forming zones in the initial stage.  The zone winners progress to semi-finals and then to a final.

A Second XI T20 championship was launched in 2011.

List of Second XI Champions

 1959	Gloucestershire II
 1960	Northamptonshire II
 1961	Kent II
 1962	Worcestershire II
 1963	Worcestershire II
 1964	Lancashire II
 1965	Glamorgan II
 1966	Surrey II
 1967	Hampshire II
 1968	Surrey II
 1969	Kent II
 1970	Kent II
 1971	Hampshire II
 1972	Nottinghamshire II
 1973	Essex II
 1974	Middlesex II
 1975	Surrey II
 1976	Kent II
 1977	Yorkshire II
 1978	Sussex II
 1979	Warwickshire II
 1980	Glamorgan II
 1981	Hampshire II
 1982	Worcestershire II
 1983	Leicestershire II
 1984	Yorkshire II
 1985	Nottinghamshire II
 1986	Lancashire II
 1987	Kent II, Yorkshire II (shared)
 1988	Surrey II
 1989	Middlesex II
 1990	Sussex II
 1991	Yorkshire II
 1992	Surrey II
 1993	Middlesex II
 1994	Somerset II
 1995	Hampshire II
 1996	Warwickshire II
 1997	Lancashire II
 1998	Northamptonshire II
 1999	Middlesex II
 2000	Middlesex II
 2001	Hampshire II
 2002	Kent II
 2003	Yorkshire II
 2004	Somerset II
 2005	Kent II
 2006	Kent II
 2007  Sussex II
 2008  Durham II
 2009  Surrey II
 2010  Surrey II
 2011  Warwickshire II
 2012  Kent II
 2013  Lancashire II, Middlesex II (shared)
 2014  Leicestershire II
 2015  Nottinghamshire II
 2016  Durham II
 2017  Lancashire II
 2018  Durham II
 2019  Hampshire II
 2020 Not held due to Covid-19 pandemic
 2021 Hampshire II
 2022 Yorkshire II

List of Second XI Trophy Winners

 2001	Surrey II
 2002	Kent II
 2003	Hampshire II
 2004	Worcestershire II
 2005	Sussex II
 2006	Warwickshire II
 2007  Middlesex II
 2008	Hampshire II
 2009  Yorkshire II
 2010  Essex II
 2011  Nottinghamshire II
 2012  Lancashire II
 2013  Lancashire II
 2014  Leicestershire II
 2015  Derbyshire II
 2016  Lancashire II
 2017  Yorkshire II
 2018  Middlesex II
 2019	Kent II

List of Second XI T20 Winners
2011  Sussex II
2012  England U19
2013  Surrey II
2014  Leicestershire II
2015  Middlesex II
2016  Middlesex II
2017  Sussex II
2018  Lancashire II
2019  Glamorgan II
2021  Warwickshire II

External sources

General sources
 Playfair Cricket Annual 2007
 Wisden Cricketers' Almanack 2007

English domestic cricket competitions